Gadella is a genus of morid cod. The species in this genus are characterised by the absence of a chin barbell, an anterior dorsal fin with 7-11 rays, a long based anal fin which has a straight profile, the outermost rays of the pelvic fin are filamentous and extend a small distance beyond the membrane. They do not have a photophore. The Gadella codlings are found around the tropical and subtropical seas around the world on the outer continental shelf to the mid continental slope. They are of no interest to fisheries.

Species
The currently recognized species in this genus are:
 Gadella brocca Paulin & C. D. Roberts, 1997
 Gadella dancoheni Sazonov & Shcherbachev, 2000
 Gadella edelmanni (A. B. Brauer, 1906)
 Gadella filifer (Garman, 1899)
 Gadella imberbis (Vaillant, 1888) (beardless codling)
 Gadella jordani (J. E. Böhlke & Mead, 1951) (Jordan's cod)
 Gadella macrura Sazonov & Shcherbachev, 2000 (longtail cod)
 Gadella maraldi (A. Risso, 1810) (gadella)
 Gadella molokaiensis Paulin, 1989
 Gadella norops Paulin, 1987
 Gadella obscurus (Parin, 1984)
 Gadella svetovidovi Trunov, 1992
 Gadella thysthlon Long & McCosker, 1998

See also

 Prehistoric fish
 List of prehistoric bony fish

References

Pliocene fish
Moridae